is a Japanese tokusatsu comedy family robot television series created by Shotaro Ishinomori and produced by Toei. It ran from October 4, 1974, to March 25, 1977, on NET TV.  ran from January 31, 1999 (a week after the finale of Tetsuwan Tantei Robotack) to January 23, 2000 (a week before the premiere of Kamen Rider Kuuga). This series joined Kyuukyuu Sentai GoGoFive.

The story follows Robocon, a student of Gantz's Robot Academy who lives amongst humans and aids them as part of his studies. Though Robocon is a screw up, he makes efforts to establish a good image for robots in the eyes of humans they cross paths with.

On December 10, 1999, Toei released the direct to video movie  where the Robocon of the 90s meets the original Robocon from the 70s.

In 2006, Cartoon Network planned to develop a western animated adaptation titled Robocon! The series would have been set in a futuristic city called Neo-Con City. The series never went beyond an animatic pilot.

A new film  was released theatrically on July 31, 2020. It is paired with the anime films Jintai no Survival and Sprin' Pan Mae e Susumō!. Robots 
Note: The characters listed are from both the original series and the 1999 series, Moero!! Robocon.
 Robocon: A robot who lives amongst humans and aids them as part of his studies at Robot Academy. However, Robocon is a screw-up and is afraid of cockroaches. He can transform into the Robocon Car.
 Gantsu Sensei: The robot teacher of Robot Academy who built all his student robots, who he accesses via the Scoring Connecter to check their "study" of the week.
 Robobin: A snail-like delivery robot who is normal of leisure until he transforms into bike-mode, becoming fast yet impulsive. He always makes sure his deliveries get there on time and takes his job very seriously. Unfortunately, Robocon seems to always be there to mess things up for him somehow getting him a low score in the end.
 Robo-P: A policewoman robot who likes to whistle. She has a huge crush on Robocon and is usually distracted from her duties because of it.
 Robogeta: Though a weather forecasting robot, his forecast rarely proves right. What he does is throw his slipper into the air and judges the weather from the position it lands in. He always scores low because of this. He later makes friends with Roboboss as the bullies to Robocon.
 Robokero: A frog-karaoke robot. He always tries to improve the mood with singing and believes that songs are a good way of cheering people up. He scores decently, but what he does usually isn't sufficient enough to earn a perfect score.
 Robomogu: An egg-shaped chef robot who works in a restaurant and serves people delicious food. He's friendly and sociable, but takes his cooking very seriously.
 Robodigi: Robodigi is a robot with a large monitor like head with two number digits as eyes (his neutral eyes is the number eight and the line in the middle moves to show sadness/anger) He always speaks politely and is a know it all. He works in a laboratory helping solve complex problems.
 Roboboss: He works at a construction site and is physically the most powerful robot in his class. Rash and impulsive, he is always looking for ways to get a perfect score. And once that gets too hard he tries to find ways to ruin everyone else's.
 Robina-chan: A robotic ballerina who Robocon has a crush on. Robina-chan played a major role in the film "Robocon Dai Boken" in which she was kidnapped by space pirates when their leader, the elderly warlock Akuma, wants her as his bride. The original actress who played Robina-chan returned for a cameo in the Heisei version of the show, Moero!! Robocon''.
Robopu: A robot with a teapot for a head.
Roboinu: A dog-like robot who wears a bucket on his head.
Robopecha: A medic robot with a medical needle in place of his right hand.
Robogari: A teacher robot with a lightbulb-shaped head. He always gets a perfect score, which annoys Robocon.
Roboton: A construction robot with a hammer for a face.

Cast
Shintaro Oyama: Shigehisa Ōno
Hatsue Oyama: Midori Katō
Hajime Oyama: Yoshikazu Yamada
Midori Oyama: Mayumi Sakuma
Makoto Oyama: Nobuyoshi Fukuda
Robin-chan: Kaho Shimada
Yamamoto-sensei: Yukari Yamamoto
Officer Machida: Tōru Yuri
Taro Ogawa: Masahiro Sumiyoshi
Yoshiko Ogawa: Miyuki Ueda
Mayumi Ogawa: Yukiko Ebina
Susumu Ogawa: Makoto Honda
Mitsuko Kurihara: Mie
Momoko Kurihara: Saori Nara
Osamu Kurihara: Keisuke Mishima
Jun Kurihara: Jōtarō Koike
Gotaro Kurihara: Ikkei Watanabe
Robina-chan: Natsuki Katō

Voice Cast
Robocon: Keiko Yamamoto
Robocon: Kazue Ikura
Gantz-sensei: Keiichi Noda
Robogari: Sachiko Chijimatsu
Robopar/Robo Mecha: Kōji Yada
Robowal/Robopu/Robobin: Ichirō Nagai
Robodoro/Roboton: Kenichi Ogata
Roboton: Keaton Yamada
Robosho/Robokiwi/Robochoi: Sanji Hase
Roboton/Robogaki/Robogera: Osamu Katō
Robopecha/Robopyon: Kazuko Sawada
Robowal/Robocar: Yonehiko Kitagawa
Robodeki: Akira Kamiya
Robomero: Junko Hori
Roboinu: Kaneta Kimotsuki/Shun Yashiro
Roboriki: Hiroshi Masuoka
Robopeka: Isamu Tanonaka
Robo-chan: Kazuko Sugiyama
Robobin: Tomokazu Seki
Robo-P: Keiko Han
Robogeta: Kaneta Kimotsuki
Robokero: Daisuke Sakaguchi
Robomogu: Kōji Yusa
Roboboss: Kazuki Yao

Theme Songs
All songs were sung by Ichirou Mizuki and composed by Shunsuke Kikuchi.

OP 1: Ganbare Robocon, written by Shotaro Ishinomori
OP 2:  by Shotaro Ishinomori
ED 1:  written by Saburō Yatsude
ED 2:  by Saburō Yatsude
Summer ED:  by Saburō Yatsude
Winter ED:  by Shotaro Ishinomori

References

1974 Japanese television series debuts
1977 Japanese television series endings
1999 Japanese television series debuts
2000 Japanese television series endings
Japanese comedy television series
Japanese television shows featuring puppetry
Shotaro Ishinomori
Toei tokusatsu
Tokusatsu television series
TV Asahi original programming